Pondwell is an area of the Isle of Wight between Nettlestone and Ryde (Wight is an English island off the southern coast). According to the Post Office the population for the area at the 2011 Census was included in the civil parish of Nettlestone and Seaview. The houses are arranged to the south east of a crossroads known as Bullen Cross, which features a vintage electricity junction box from a 19th-century local power generating company. Known as a "supply pillar" it features a once-plentiful "batwing" lantern manufactured by Electric Street Lighting Apparatus (ESLA) of Canterbury. Pondwell is also the site of Seaview Wildlife Encounter — formerly Flamingo Park, a small zoo and waterfowl park. There is also a pub called the "Wishing Well" (free house). It also offers holiday chalets at the Salterns and a nail technician, mortgage broker and the chair of the IOW Table Tennis Association.  The beach at the bottom of the Salterns was formerly a thriving harbour for timber export; at that time the low-lying land at the foot of Pondwell Hill formed a tidal inlet of the sea known as Barnsley Creek.

References 

 isleofwightonline 
 Discovering the Isle of Wight by Patricia Sibley

Villages on the Isle of Wight